

History 
The Orin Welch Aircraft Company was originally located in Charleston, West Virginia. It purchased the holdings of the Muncie Aerial Company in 1928. In 1929, it inaugurated a new airfield southwest of Anderson, Indiana. Later that year, it would be purchased by the city. Unfortunately, fire destroyed the plant in 1930. As a result, it eventually moved to Bendix Municipal Airport in South Bend, Indiana in 1936. By 1939, it had been renamed Welch Aircraft Industries. It was then acquired by the Aircraft Corporation of La Porte, Indiana in 1940. It was then moved to the Wyoming Valley Airport near Wilkes Barre, Pennsylvania. By 1941, it was planned for a new factory to be located in Exeter, Pennsylvania. Then, in 1943, a proposal was made to relocate to Scranton, Pennsylvania. However, in 1944 the company went bankrupt.

Aircraft

References

Notes

Bibliography

External links 
 Orin Welch Aircraft Company – Javalina

Defunct aircraft manufacturers of the United States